Arie van der Velden (12 December 1881 – 6 December 1967) was a Dutch sailor who competed in the 1900 Summer Olympics in Paris, France. With helmsman Henri Smulders and fellow crew Chris Hooykaas, Van der Velde took the silver in the 1st race and the 4th place in the second race of the 3 to 10 ton.

References

External links

 

1881 births
1967 deaths
Dutch male sailors (sport)
Sportspeople from Rotterdam
Sailors at the 1900 Summer Olympics – 3 to 10 ton
Olympic sailors of the Netherlands
Olympic silver medalists for the Netherlands
Sailors at the 1900 Summer Olympics – Open class